Julia Ann Sampson Hayward (née Sampson; February 2, 1934 – December 27, 2011) was a female tennis player from the United States who was active in the 1950s. She won two Grand Slam titles in doubles.

Tennis career
As the second seeded foreign player, Sampson reached the singles final of the 1953 Australian Championships, losing to Maureen Connolly in straight sets.

Sampson and Rex Hartwig teamed to win the mixed doubles title at the 1953 Australian Championships, defeating Connolly and Ham Richardson in the final 6–4, 6–3. Sampson and Hartwig reached the mixed doubles final at the 1953 U.S. Championships, losing to Doris Hart and Vic Seixas 6–2, 4–6, 6–4.

Connolly and Sampson teamed to win the women's doubles title at the 1953 Australian Championships, defeating Mary Bevis Hawton and Beryl Penrose in the final 6–4, 6–2. At both the French Championships and Wimbledon in 1953, Connolly and Sampson lost in the final to Doris Hart and Shirley Fry Irvin. The score in the Wimbledon final was 6–0, 6–0, which was the only double bagel in the history of Wimbledon women's doubles finals. At the 1953 U.S. Championships, Connolly and Sampson once more lost to Hart and Irvin, again in the final 6–4, 6–3.

Sampson was ranked tenth in the year-end rankings issued by the United States Lawn Tennis Association for 1952 and 1953.

Personal life
She married Daniel Hayward in 1958 and the couple, who later divorced, had three children.

Grand Slam finals

Singles (1 runner-up)

Doubles  (1 title - 2 runner-up)

Mixed doubles (1 title, 1 runner-up)

Grand Slam singles tournament timeline

See also 
 Performance timelines for all female tennis players who reached at least one Grand Slam final

References

American female tennis players
Australian Championships (tennis) champions
Tennis players from Los Angeles
1934 births
2011 deaths
Grand Slam (tennis) champions in women's doubles
Grand Slam (tennis) champions in mixed doubles
21st-century American women